The 1978 Cal Poly Pomona Broncos football team represented California State Polytechnic University, Pomona as a member of the California Collegiate Athletic Association (CCAA) during the 1978 NCAA Division II football season. Led by second-year head coach Jim Jones, Cal Poly Pomona compiled an overall record of 3–7 with a mark of 1–1 in conference play, placing second in the CCAA. The team was outscored by its opponents 202 to 155 for the season. The Broncos played home games at Kellogg Field in Pomona, California.

Schedule

References

Cal Poly Pomona
Cal Poly Pomona Broncos football seasons
Cal Poly Pomona Broncos football